Fashion house can refer to:

 A commercial company associated exclusively with fashion, either ready-to-wear, bespoke, or haute couture
 Fashion House, a 2006 telenovela